"Happy Song" is a 1983 hit single by Italian disco music act Baby's Gang. The single became a European hit single when covered by German band Boney M. the following year.

Track listing and formats 

 Italian 7-inch single

A. "Happy Song" – 3:20
B. "Ice Cream" – 3:20

 Italian 12-inch single

A. "Happy Song" – 5:40
B. "Ice Cream" – 5:00

 German 7-inch single

A. "Happy Song" – 3:28
B. "Ice Cream" – 3:25

Boney M. version 

After Boney M.'s return to the charts with a cover of the Italian hit "Kalimba de Luna", producer Frank Farian rushed back into the studio to cover another Italian hit single. He invited Boney M.'s original dancer Bobby Farrell to join the group along with a group of children from Rhein-Main Air Base Elementary and Jr. High, credited as The School Rebels, who did the lead vocals together with Reggie Tsiboe. While Bobby Farrell did a rap, original singers Liz Mitchell and Marcia Barrett did not participate in the recording. Session vocalists La Mama (Patricia Shockley, Madeleine Davis and Judy Cheeks) did the additional female vocals. The single gave the group their final German Top 10 hit single (#7), their first in nearly four years.

Track listing  and formats 

 European 7-inch single

A. "Happy Song" – 4:18
B. "School's Out" – 3:15

 European 12-inch maxi-single

A. "Happy Song" – 8:12
B. "School's Out" – 3:15

Charts

Weekly charts

References

External links 

 

1983 songs
1983 singles
Baby's Gang songs
Boney M. songs
Hansa Records singles
Song recordings produced by Frank Farian